The LP is the debut solo album of American emcee and producer Large Professor. It was released officially in 2009, after being shelved in 1996 by Geffen Records after several delays. "The Mad Scientist" and "I Juswannachill" were released as singles prior to the anticipated release, and a bootleg was circulated. In 2002, Large Professor regained the rights to the recordings and released the album as a promo-only CD.

2002 Version

2009 Version

References

1996 debut albums
Large Professor albums
Geffen Records albums
Albums produced by Large Professor